Hiraji (NZ), foaled in 1943, was a New Zealand-bred Thoroughbred racehorse best known for winning the Melbourne Cup.

Hiraji was a grey gelding sired by Nizami (Fr) out of Duvach by Foxbridge (GB). He was bred in 1943 at Duvach Lodge, Matamata, New Zealand.

Hiraji was owned by F. W. Hughes and trained by J.W. McCurley. In the 1947 Melbourne Cup he carried a weight of 7-11 (109 pounds and was ridden by Jack Purtell. Starting at odds of 12/1 in a field of 30 runners he won the cup by half a length from Fresh Boy.

Reference list

See also
 Thoroughbred racing in New Zealand
 Thoroughbred racing in Australia
 List of Melbourne Cup winners

1943 racehorse births
Racehorses bred in New Zealand
Racehorses trained in New Zealand
Melbourne Cup winners
Sport in Cambridge, New Zealand
Thoroughbred family 8-k